Emmanuel Andrews Sammini (born 22 December 1981 in Accra, Ghana), known by his stage name Samini (formerly as Batman Samini), is a Ghanaian Reggae and Dance hall recording artiste from Wa, Ghana. His genre of music is a melodious mixture of high life, dance hall, reggae and hip-hop. He terms his brand of music as the "African dance hall". He signed his first record deal with Ashanti International. Samini started his record label after he left the aforementioned label.

Samini has released seven studio albums, with all being highly successful on the commercial market. Samini's success and recognition began when his first single, Linda, was released and subsequently appearing on other successful singles by other artists.

On 13 December 2018, Samini was en-skinned as a Chief in his home town. The title given to him by the WaNaa (Paramount Chief of Wa) is `Pebilii Naa’, which means `King of the Rocks’ in Wa.

Background information
Sammini started singing in a church choir at the age of 14 and became a professional musician after a musical collaboration with another musician in 1999. His debut studio album, Dankwasere, was released in 2004; it topped the local music charts for weeks and won two awards at the Ghana Music Awards. The album was supported by the single "Linda". He has performed alongside Sean Paul, Akon, Kevin Little, Shaggy, Wayne Wonder, Damian Marley, Bennie Man, Jay-Z, Chaka Demus & Pliers, Culture (Joseph Hill)(of Blessed Memory) and Steel Pulse. He collaborated with Steel Pulse and Etana from Jamaica. He has received international recognition and toured the UK, Germany, Italy, Canada, and the Netherlands.

He received international recognition when he won the "Best African Act" at the 2006 MOBO Awards. After releasing his second self-titled studio album, Samini, he won three awards at the then 2007 Vodafone Ghana Music Awards. In February 2008, Samini won the "African Artiste of the Year" award at The Headies. His third studio album, Dagaati, was released in 2008. After launching his 7th studio album on 22 December 2018 titled UNTAMED he won the Reggaeville 2018, Album of the Year.

Discography

Studio albums
 Dankwasere (2004)
 Samini (2007)
 Dagaati (2008)
 C.E.O (2010)
 Next Page (2013)
 Breaking News (2015)
 Untamed (2018)

Singles
 Tsoobi featuring Rowan, Senario & Razben

Videography

Awards and nominations

MOBO Awards

|-
|rowspan="1"|2006
|rowspan="1"|Himself 
|Best African Act
|

The Headies

|-
|rowspan="1"|2010
|rowspan="1"|Himself
|Best African Act
|

Channel O Music Video Awards

|-
|rowspan="1"|2011
|rowspan="1"|Himself 
|Most Gifted Reggae Dancehall Video Artist
|

Bass Awards

|-
|rowspan="3"|2013
|rowspan="3"|Himself
|Kwame Nkrumah Award (Artiste of the Year)
|
|-
|Best Performer(Reggae/Dancehall)
|
|-
|Best Dancehall Artiste
|

MTV Africa Music Awards

|-
|rowspan="1"|2009
|rowspan="1"|Himself 
|Best Performer
|

Ghana Music Awards

|-
|Rowspan="2"|2005
|Rowspan="2"|Himself 
|Artiste of the Year
|
|-
|HipLife Artist of the Year
| 
|-
|Rowspan="3"|2007
|Rowspan="3"|Himself 
|African Magic Artiste of the Year
|
|-
|Pop Song of the Year
|
|-
|Record Song of the Year
|
|-
|Rowspan="1"|2011
|Rowspan="1"|Himself 
|Album of the Year
|
|-
|Rowspan="3"|2021
|Rowspan="3"|Himself 
|Reggae Dance-hall Song of The Year 
|
|-

Nominations
 2006 MTV Europe Music Awards 2006 – Best African Act
 2008 MTV Africa Music Awards – Best Performer
Black Canadian Awards 2014– Best International Act 
Ghana Music Awards 2014– Artist of the Year
 Ghana Music Awards 2014– Reggae Dance hall Song (scatter bad mind)
Ghana Music Awards 2011– Artist of the Year 
Ghana Music Awards 2011 – Afro Pop Song of the Year 
Ghana Music Awards 2011– Album of the Year 
Ghana Music Awards 2012– Reggae Song of the Year 
IRWM Awards- Best African Entertainer
Bass Awards 2013– Most Popular Dance hall Song
Bass Awards 2013– Best Collaboration (Time Bomb ft wiz kid)
Bass Awards 2013– Best Dance hall Music Video
MOAMA Awards 2010– Best African album
Ghana DJ Awards- Song of the Year 2010
Ghana Music Awards UK 2018 – Reggae/Dance hall song of the year
Ghana music awards UK 2019-Special recognition award
Ghana Music Awards 2020-Reggae/Dance hall artist of the year
Ghana Music Awards 2021- Reggae/Dance hall song of the year

References

External links 
 

Living people
1981 births
Musicians from Accra
Ghanaian highlife musicians
The Headies winners
Ghanaian reggae musicians